Dwadash Shiva Temples are ancient Hindu temples located in Barisha locality of Kolkata, West Bengal, India, dedicated to God Shiva. The cluster of 12 temples were built in athchala style by Raja Santosh Ray Chowdhury over 350 years ago.

References

External links 

Shiva temples
Hindu temples in Kolkata
17th-century Hindu temples